Peetoom is a surname. Notable people with the surname include:

Darren Peetoom (born 1969), English professional darts player
Kirsten Peetoom (born 1988), Dutch professional racing cyclist
Ruth Peetoom (born 1967), Dutch politician